Virūḍhaka or Virudhaka may refer to:

Virūḍhaka (Heavenly King), one of the Four Heavenly Kings in the Buddhist pantheon
Virudhaka (raja), king of Kasi-Kosala